Interstate 10 (I-10) in the US state of New Mexico is a  long route of the United States Interstate Highway System. I-10 traverses southern New Mexico through Hidalgo, Grant, Luna, and Doña Ana counties. The interstate travels west–east from the Arizona state line to the interchange with I-25 in Las Cruces, and then travels north–south to the Texas state line. US Route 80 in New Mexico (US 80) was replaced by I-10.

Route description
I-10 enters Hidalgo County, New Mexico from Cochise County, Arizona as a four lane divided highway. The highway travels east through rural southwest New Mexico, passing between Steins Mountain and Attorney Mountain, part of the Peloncillo Mountains, before passing by the ghost town of Steins. Continuing east, the northern terminus of New Mexico State Road 80 (NM 80) is intersected, serving Rodeo, followed by NM 338. Passing Lee Peak, the highway turns southeast, entering Lordsburg. US 70 is intersected in town, and becomes concurrent with the highway as it continues east past the Lordsburg Municipal Airport, before exiting the town. Near the Grant County line,  the highway bypasses the ghost town called Shakespeare. Entering Grant County, the highway continues southeast then northeast after intersecting NM 146. The highway passes over the Continental Divide on the Grant–Luna county line. Continuing east, the highway intersects the city of Deming and the highway becomes concurrent with US 180 as the three highways continue east. The highway enters Doña Ana County as it approaches Las Cruces. US 70 exits the highway as it enters the city (becoming Picacho Avenue), and the interstate begins to turn south. Just south of the New Mexico State University campus, I-10 has a junction with the southern terminus of I-25. At the I-25 junction, I-10/US 180 also becomes concurrent with US 85. At this point, the highway is now headed almost due south before crossing into Anthony, Texas (in El Paso County, Texas) from Anthony, New Mexico (in Doña Ana County).

History

I-10 replaced US 80 through New Mexico, bypassing major portions of old US 80 in the western portion of the state and in Doña Ana County. US 80 was one of the original United States Numbered Highways established in 1926. The portion of US 80 between the Arizona state line and Anthony was decommissioned on October 6, 1989, while the remainder of the route through the state was removed October 12, 1991.

From 1927 to 1960, the section of I-10 between Road Forks and the Arizona state line was designated New Mexico State Road 14 (NM 14). US 80 itself looped south to Douglas, Arizona at the Mexico–US border between Road Forks and Benson. By the late 1940s, NM 14 had been paved and carried the majority of US 80 traffic by 1950. With the advent of I-10, NM 14 was removed from the state road system in 1960.

The interstate was first numbered I-10 by the American Association of State Highway Officials, in cooperation with the Department of Commerce, in 1957.

Exit list

See also
Business routes of Interstate 10

References

External links

Transportation in Hidalgo County, New Mexico
Transportation in Grant County, New Mexico
Transportation in Luna County, New Mexico
Transportation in Doña Ana County, New Mexico
 New Mexico
10